The Independent Music Group or IMG is one of the UK's larger independent publishers.

History
It was founded in 1989 by Ellis Rich, who had worked in the international division of EMI Music Publishing (managing EMI's UK catalogue overseas and international catalogues in the UK from 1975 to 81). It acquired publishing catalogues and small publishers. The company deals with smaller publishers and artists to get their work to a larger international network and market.

The internet has since helped smaller music publishers to affordably reach a global market, at the same time as helping many people to illegally share (distribute) copyrighted music, to the chagrin of the mainstream music industry.

Structure
Ellis Rich, the Chief Executive, was Chairman of PRS He was also a director of the Music Publishers Association and the Mechanical-Copyright Protection Society (MCPS). He had formed E&S Music with Simon Cowell in the 1980s - Cowell's first commercial venture.

External links
 IMG

Video clips
 Ellis Rich in June 2010 on The Bottom Line

Publishing companies established in 1989
Loughton
Companies based in Essex
Music publishing companies of the United Kingdom